Richie Mehta is a Canadian film director and writer. His first feature film, Amal, was released in 2008, and was nominated for Best Motion Picture and Best Director at the 29th Genie Awards.

In 2013, Mehta released two films he wrote and directed - Siddharth (which premiered at the Venice Film Festival, before receiving over 25 International Awards); and I'll Follow You Down, a science fiction film starring Gillian Anderson and Rufus Sewell.

In October 2015, Mehta teamed up with Ridley Scott and  Google, as the director of the documentary India in a Day, which premiered at the Toronto International Film Festival.

In March 2019, Mehta created, wrote, and directed all episodes of the drama series Delhi Crime, based on the 2012 Delhi gang rape case. The series was released on Netflix to rave reviews.

The series won the International Emmy Award for Best Drama Series (2020); and the Asian Academy Award for Best Drama Series (2019), and Best Direction (Fiction).

Mehta was born in Mississauga, Ontario.

Selected filmography
 Amal (2007)
 Siddharth (2013)
 I'll Follow You Down (2013)
 India in a Day (2016)
 Delhi Crime (2019)

References

External links

Canadian male screenwriters
Canadian people of Indian descent
Film directors from Ontario
Writers from Mississauga
Living people
Canadian writers of Asian descent
Year of birth missing (living people)
Asian-Canadian filmmakers
21st-century Canadian screenwriters
21st-century Canadian male writers